EOF or Eof may refer to:

Science and technology
 Electro-osmotic flow, the motion of liquid induced by an applied potential
 Empirical orthogonal functions, in statistics and signal processing
 Ethyl orthoformate, an organic compound

Computing
 End-of-file, a condition where no more data can be read from a data source
 Enterprise Objects Framework, a NeXT object-relational mapping product
 EoF, a song editing program for the free Guitar Hero clone Frets on Fire
 Ethereum Object Format, an object container standard specifying header, code, data, types

Other uses
 Eof (about 701), a swineherd who claimed to have seen a vision of the Virgin Mary in England
 End of Fashion, an Australian band